Events in the year 2023 in Poland.

Incumbents 

 President:  Andrzej Duda
 Prime Minister: Mateusz Morawiecki
 Marshal of the Sejm: Elżbieta Witek
 Marshal of the Senate: Tomasz Grodzki

Events

January
3 January – CVC Capital Partners signes a preliminary agreement for the sale of PKP Energetyka to state owned power company PGE.
9 February – Poland announces the closure of a major border crossing with Belarus "until further notice" amid heightened tensions between the two countries. There are currently only two checkpoints open between the two nations.
25 February – Refiner PKN Orlen announces that Russia has suspended oil exports to Poland via the northern branch of the Druzhba pipeline.

Predicted and scheduled events
23 June – 21 July – 2023 European Games in Kraków and Małopolska
On or before 11 November – 2023 Polish parliamentary election.

Deaths 

 4 January – Stefan Wojnecki, 93, photographer and academic.
 9 January – 
 Stefan Brzózka, 91, chess player.
 Wacław Sadkowski, 89, literary critic and translator, editor of Literatura na Świecie and president of Czytelnik Publishing House.
 11 January – Jan Ludwiczak, 85, coal miner and Solidarity activist.
 13 January – Zenon Pigoń, 82, trade unionist and politician, MP (1989–1991).
 17 January – Maria Dworzecka, 81, Polish-American physicist and Holocaust survivor.
 21 January –
 Marek Plura, 52, politician and psychotherapist, MEP (2014–2019).
 Włodzimierz Sroka, 55, economist and manager.
 25 January – Franciszek Jamroż, 79, trade unionist and politician, mayor of Gdańsk (1991–1994).
 27 January – Aleksander Krawczuk, 100, historian, minister of culture (1986–1989) and MP (1991–1997).
 29 January – Piotr Waśko, 61, politician, MP (2007–2011).
 31 January – Anna Czerwińska, 73, mountaineer.

References

 
Poland
Poland
2020s in Poland
Years of the 21st century in Poland